Phạm Hạp (930s – 979) was a general of the Đinh dynasty. Some Chinese records call him one of Seven Heroes of Giao-châu (交州七雄).

Biography

See also

References

Works cited
 Về việc đồng nhất Phạm Tu và Lý Phục Man

930s births
979 deaths
Year of birth uncertain
Đinh dynasty generals
Đinh dynasty officials